Ida Fauziyah (born 17 July 1969) is an Indonesian politician. , she serves as Minister of Manpower in the 41st Cabinet of Indonesia. She is affiliated with the National Awakening Party.

Health
On 3 December 2020, Ida was tested positive for COVID-19. She was the fourth minister in the Onward Indonesia Cabinet to be declared COVID-19 positive after Minister of Transportation Budi Karya Sumadi, Minister of Maritime Affairs and Fisheries Edhy Prabowo (resigned due to corruption), and Minister of Religion Affairs Fachrul Razi.

References 

Living people
1969 births
Place of birth missing (living people)
21st-century Indonesian politicians
Onward Indonesia Cabinet
National Awakening Party politicians
Women government ministers of Indonesia
21st-century Indonesian women politicians